Bucakköy may refer to:

 Bucakköy, Alanya, village in Antalya Province, Turkey
 Bucakköy, Kozan, village in Adana Province, Turkey
 Bucakköy, Kuyucak, village in Aydın Province, Turkey
 Bucakköy, Serik, village in Antalya Province, Turkey